Ivan Perrillat Boiteux (born 28 December 1985) is a French cross-country skier.

He represented France at the 2014 Winter Olympics in Sochi. On February 16 he ran the fourth (free skiing) leg in the men's team relay and became a bronze medalist, together with his team mates Robin Duvillard, Jean-Marc Gaillard, and Maurice Manificat. This was the first ever French Olympic medal in cross-country team relay.

Cross-country skiing results
All results are sourced from the International Ski Federation (FIS).

Olympic Games
 1 medal – (1 bronze)

World Championships

World Cup

Season standings

References

French male cross-country skiers
Tour de Ski skiers
Cross-country skiers at the 2014 Winter Olympics
Olympic cross-country skiers of France
Medalists at the 2014 Winter Olympics
Olympic bronze medalists for France
Olympic medalists in cross-country skiing
1985 births
Living people